Gorytes dorothyae is a species of sand wasp in the family Crabronidae. It is found in North America.

Subspecies
These two subspecies belong to the species Gorytes dorothyae:
 Gorytes dorothyae dorothyae Krombein, 1954
 Gorytes dorothyae russeolus Krombein, 1954

References

Crabronidae
Articles created by Qbugbot
Insects described in 1950